Hawick Target Hill Greyhound Track was a former greyhound racing track in Hawick in the Scottish Borders.

The greyhound track was located between Mosshills Loch and Braid Road, south east of Hawick. The track opened in 1939 adjacent to Target Field after some form of early greyhound racing existed at nearby Millers Knowes. The name 'Target' derives from Boozieburn Rifle Range. It was a small independent (unlicensed) track and closed in 1967 and is now private kennels.

References

Defunct greyhound racing venues in the United Kingdom
Greyhound racing in Scotland
Sports venues in the Scottish Borders
Hawick